Eunoe anderssoni is a scale worm described from the Antarctic Ocean off South Georgia at depths of about 300–500 m.

Description
Number of segments 34; elytra 15 pairs. Light brownish grey, darker from about segment 11; prostomium white. Anterior margin of prostomium with an acute anterior projection. Lateral antennae inserted ventrally (beneath prostomium and median antenna). Notochaetae distinctly thicker than neurochaetae. Bidentate neurochaetae absent.

References

Phyllodocida
Animals described in 1916